This Is What I Mean is the third studio album by British rapper Stormzy, released through #Merky and 0207 Def Jam on 25 November 2022. It follows Stormzy's 2019 album Heavy Is the Head, and was preceded by the lead single "Hide & Seek" and the follow-up single "Firebabe". It was nominated for Album of the Year at the 2023 Brit Awards.

Background
The album was recorded on Osea Island in England during a series of music camps with a team of "world class musicians and the best producers, writers and artists in the world" in a "free atmosphere", where Stormzy "prayed every morning" during its creation. It was further described as an "intimate love letter to music" by Stormzy.

The album's announcement follows the release of the single "Mel Made Me Do It" on 23 September 2022, which was not included on the album.

Promotion
Following a break of almost three years from social media, Stormzy announced the album on his social media on 12 October 2022, sharing the cover art and track list. The lead single "Hide & Seek" was released on 14 October 2022, and was preceded by clips of Stormzy recording the song. The second single "Firebabe" followed on 10 November 2022.

Critical reception

Will Hodgkinson of The Times described the album as a "major achievement" with atypical guest stars from "contemporary Afrobeat, soul and R&B", while David Smyth of the Evening Standard called it Stormzy's "most downbeat, intimate collection" that "very much sounds like a team effort[, t]hough the feel is insular and understated". Smyth summarised the two main themes on the album as being Stormzy "hurting from a break-up" and "the need for the advancement of black culture as a whole".

Track listing

Personnel
Musicians

 Stormzy – vocals
 Jack Shepherd – acoustic guitar (tracks 1, 6, 9), electric guitar (1, 3, 6, 7)
 Marco Bernardis – alto saxophone (1), flute (1), tenor saxophone (7)
 Debbie Ehirim – background vocals (1, 3), vocals (3, 12)
 Jacob Collier – background vocals (1–4, 11), piano (4, 8), vocals (12)
 Kz – background vocals, programming (1)
 Sampha – background vocals (1, 3), vocals (8)
 Tendai – background vocals (1), programming (1, 3), bass guitar (2), piano (3), vocals (5); additional vocals, keyboards (10)
 Prgrshn – programming (1, 5, 7), bass guitar (1, 5), piano (1, 2), percussion (1), keyboards (5–7, 9, 10, 11)
 Aaron Blake – piano (1)
 Joel Peters – programming (1, 3–7, 10), piano (1, 3), bass guitar (3, 12), keyboards (7, 12)
 Calum Landau – programming (1, 3, 5–7, 10), bass guitar (3, 10, 11)
 Gabriele Pribetti – saxophone (1)
 Knox Brown – background vocals (2)
 Storry – background vocals (2)
 P2J – programming (2, 5, 6, 10, 11), bass guitar (2, 5, 10), drums (2)
 Dave Daniels – cello (2)
 Llinos Richards – cello (2)
 Magda Pietraszewska – cello (2)
 Victoria Harrild – cello (2)
 Laurence Ungless – double bass (2)
 Steve Williams – double bass (2)
 Julian Hinton – strings (2, 3, 11); orchestra contractor, orchestra leader (2); programming (11)
 Laurie Anderson – viola (2)
 Lydia Lowndes-Northcott – viola (2)
 Nick Barr – viola (2)
 Paul Livingston – viola (2)
 Anna Croad – violin (2)
 Cathy Thompson – violin (2)
 Emma Fry – violin (2)
 Henry Salmon – violin (2)
 Jackie Roche – violin (2)
 Jamie Hutchinson – violin (2)
 Janice Graham – violin (2)
 Jo Archard – violin (2)
 Kirsty Mangan – violin (2)
 Martin Lissola – violin (2)
 Natalia Bonner – violin (2)
 Stephanie Benedetti – violin (2)
 Steve Morris – violin (2)
 Tom Kemp – violin (2)
 Amaarae – vocals (2)
 Black Sherif – vocals (2)
 Ms Banks – vocals (2)
 Jojo Mukeza – electric guitar, programming (3)
 George Moore – piano (3, 11), programming (3)
 Ras Kassa Alexander – piano (3)
 Stephanie Hatchman – background vocals (4)
 Linden Jay – bass guitar (4, 8)
 Dion Wardle – keyboards (4, 8), piano (5, 8, 9, 12)
 Owen Cutts – keyboards (4, 8), background vocals (6)
 Godwin Sonzi – guitar (5)
 Juls – programming (5)
 Sheila Maurice-Grey – trumpet (5)
 Ayra Starr – vocals (5)
 Oxlade – background vocals (6)
 Teni – background vocals (6)
 Äyanna – background vocals (6, 7)
 Abdala Elamin – background vocals (7)
 Maleik Loveridge – choir (7), background vocals (9)
 Naomi Parchment – choir (7), background vocals (9)
 Olivia Williams – choir (7), background vocals (9)
 Serena Prince – choir (7), background vocals (9)
 Akin Amusan – choir (7)
 Cherice Voncelle – choir (7)
 Daniel Arieleno – choir (7)
 James Thompson – choir (7)
 Kieran Briscoe – choir (7)
 Nathaniel Warner – choir (7)
 Nicholas Brown – choir (7)
 Patrick Linton – choir (7)
 Paul Lee – choir (7)
 Renee Fuller – choir (7)
 Taneka Duggan – choir (7)
 India Arie – vocals (11)

Technical
 Dale Becker – mastering
 Naweed – mastering, CD Album / Singles
 Leandro "Dro" Higaldo – mixing (1, 2, 5–7, 10, 11)
 Alex Ghenea – mixing (3, 9)
 Mark "Spike" Stent – mixing (4, 8, 12)
 Joel Peters – engineering
 Calum Landau – engineering (3, 6, 12), engineering assistance (1, 2, 4, 5, 7–11)
 Mat Bartram – engineering (3)

Charts

References

2022 albums
Def Jam Recordings albums
Stormzy albums